The 2014 FIA European Truck Racing Championship was a motor-racing championship using highly tuned tractor units. It was the 30th year of the championship. Norbert Kiss won his first title with MAN, ending Jochen Hahn's run of three successive titles.

Teams and drivers

Race drivers without fixed number, whose number is defined race by race:

Calendar and winners

Championship Overall Standings

Drivers' Championship

Each round or racing event consisted of four races. At the races 1 and 3, the points awarded according to the ranking was on a 20, 15, 12, 10, 8, 6, 4, 3, 2, 1 basis to the top 10 finishers – at the races 2 and 4 with reversed grid, the points awarded were 10, 9, 8, 7, 6, 5, 4, 3, 2, 1  (rank 1 - 10) respectively.

Source of information:
and

Team Championship

Source of data:

References

External links 

Truck Race Organization
TruckRacing.de 
Race and championship results as table sheets

European Truck Racing Championship seasons
European Truck Racing Championship
Truck Racing Championship